Emidio De Felice (Milan, 1918 – Genoa, 1993) was an Italian linguist and lexicographer.

He became a university professor in 1963, teaching linguistics at the University of Genoa. Author of Italian language dictionaries, grammar books and latin anthologies, he is mainly known for his research on Italian onomastics.

Works
 La pronuncia del latino classico, Arona (Varese), Ed. Paideia, 1948. 
 Grammaticae principia : corso di latino per la scuola media, Palermo, Palumbo, 1960.
 La preposizione italiana "a", Firenze, Sansoni, 1960.
 La romanizzazione dell'estremo Sud d'Italia, Florence, L. S. Olschki, 1962.
 Le coste della Sardegna : saggio toponomastico storico-descrittivo, Cagliari, Ed. Sarda Fossataro, 1964.
 Dizionario della lingua e della civiltà italiana contemporanea, coautore Aldo Duro, Palermo, Palumbo, 1974.
 Dizionario dei cognomi italiani, Milan, A. Mondadori, 1978.
 I cognomi italiani : rilevamenti quantitativi dagli elenchi telefonici: informazioni socioeconomiche e culturali, onomastiche e linguistiche, Bologna, il Mulino, 1980.
 I nomi degli italiani. Informazioni onomastiche e linguistiche socioculturali e religiose. Rilevamenti quantitativi dei nomi personali dagli elenchi telefonici, Roma, SARIN, Venezia, Marsilio Editori, 1982. 
 Le parole d'oggi : il lessico quotidiano, religioso, intellettuale, politico, economico, scientifico, dell'arte e dei media, Milan, A. Mondadori, 1984.
 Dizionario dei nomi italiani : origine, etimologia, storia, diffusione e frequenza di oltre 18000 nomi, Milan, A. Mondadori, 1986.
 Nomi e cultura : riflessi della cultura italiana dell'Ottocento e del Novecento nei nomi personali, Venezia, Marsilio, 1987. .
 Dizionario critico dei sinonimi italiani, Venezia, Marsilio, 1991. .
 Vocabolario italiano, coautore Aldo Duro, Torino, Società editrice internazionale; Palermo, Palumbo, 1993. .

Bibliography 
Enrica Salvaneschi: Ricordo di Emidio De Felice (1918–1993). In: Quaderni della Sezione di Glottologia e Linguistica 5, 1993 (gefolgt von: Bibliografia di Emidio De Felice)
Emidio De Felice (1918–1993) e l’onomastica. Contributi inediti, rari e sparsi, a cura di Enzo Caffarelli e Rita Caprini. In: Rivista Italiana di Onomastica. 9, 2003, S. 101–290

External links
 De Felice, Emidio da L'Enciclopedia Italiana, versione on line, sito treccani.it

Linguists from Italy
Italian lexicographers
1918 births
1993 deaths
20th-century linguists
20th-century lexicographers